Manihera is a surname. Notable people with the surname include:

Jordan Manihera (born 1993), New Zealand rugby union player
Kaine Manihera (born 1986), New Zealand rugby league player